Christopher Melchert is an American professor and scholar of Islam, specialising in Islamic movements and institutions, especially during the ninth and tenth centuries. A prolific author, he is professor of Arabic and Islamic studies at the University of Oxford's Oriental Institute, and is a Fellow in Arabic at Pembroke College, Oxford.

Melchert received a PhD in History (1992) from the University of Pennsylvania. His thesis was later published as a book, titled The Formation of the Sunni Schools of Law, with Brill Publishers, Leiden.  Melchert more recently published a book on Ahmad ibn Hanbal, the Sunni hadith-scholar and jurist.

Having written about whether women can be prayer leaders according to the early Sunni and Shii jurists, he is one of the few expert historians who has written authoritatively on the question.

Selected publications

The Formation of the Sunni Schools of Law, 9th-10th Centuries C.E. (Studies in Islamic law and society, v. 4). Leiden: Brill, 1997.   
Reviewed by W. B. Hallaq in International Journal of Middle East Studies 31, no. 2, (1999): 278-280
Reviewed by P. Sanders in American Journal of Legal History 43, Part 1 (1999): 98
Ahmad ibn Hanbal.  Oxford: Oneworld, 2006 and 2012. (in 116 World Cat libraries)  The formation of the Sunni schools of law, ninth–tenth centuries AD.  1992 Ph.D thesis, University of Pennsylvania
  Religious Policies of the Caliphs from al-Mutawakkil to al-Muqtadir, AH 232-295/AD 847-908, in Islamic Law and Society, 1996 - Brill
   The transition from asceticism to mysticism at the middle of the ninth century AD, in Studia Islamica, 1996 - JSTOR
   The adversaries of Ahmad ibn Hanbal, in Arabica, 1997 - Springer
  Islamic law, in Oklahoma City University Law Review, 1998 - HeinOnline
   How Hanafism Came to Originate in Kufa and Traditionalism in Medina, in Islamic Law and Society, 1999 - Brill
   Ibn Mujāhid and the establishment of seven Qur'anic readings, in Studia Islamica, 2000 - JSTOR
   Traditionist-jurisprudents and the Framing of Islamic Law, in Islamic Law and Society, 2001 - Brill
   The Ḥanābila and the Early Sufis, in Arabica, 2001 - JSTOR
   Sufis and competing movements in Nishapur, in Iran, 2001 - JSTOR
 Various additional papers.

See also  
 Ahmad ibn Hanbal, Hanbali 
 Islamic Law, Sources of Islamic law, Principles of Islamic jurisprudence, Muslim Islamic jurist 
 Political aspects of Islam, Polygyny in Islam, Islamic feminism, Women as imams 
 Islamic Golden Age (8th-13th centuries esp. 692-945CE), Abbasid Caliphate, Quran

References

External links
 Melchert's Pembroke College page
 Melchert's Faculty page
 Melchert's CV

Year of birth missing (living people)
Living people
American Arabists
American Islamic studies scholars
Fellows of Pembroke College, Oxford
University of Pennsylvania alumni
Scholars of Islamic jurisprudence